Polymona is a genus of moths in the family Erebidae. The genus was erected by Francis Walker in 1855.

Species
Polymona finitorum (Collenette, 1931)
Polymona hemipyra (Collenette, 1932)
Polymona inaffinis Hering, 1926
Polymona philbyi (Collenette, 1933)
Polymona rubescens Rebel, 1948
Polymona rufifemur Walker, 1855
Polymona whitei Wiltshire, 1980
Polymona wiltshirei Hacker, 2016

References

Lymantriinae